Battöriin Davaajav (born 20 May 1990) is a Mongolian footballer who plays as a defender for Mongolian Premier League club Erchim and the Mongolian national team. He made his first appearance for the Mongolia national football team in 2015.

References

External links

1990 births
Living people
Mongolian footballers
Mongolia international footballers
Erchim players
Association football defenders